Cristiano Pinto Vasconcelos (born 10 July 1989) is a Portuguese footballer who plays for CF Andorinha as a  defender.

Football career
On 18 May 2013, Vasconcelos made his professional debut with Marítimo B in a 2012–13 Segunda Liga match against Aves.

References

External links

Stats and profile at LPFP 
Soccerway profile

1989 births
Sportspeople from Funchal
Living people
Portuguese footballers
Association football defenders
Liga Portugal 2 players
C.S. Marítimo players
AD Oliveirense players
C.F. União players